Richard Frederick Thompson (September 6, 1930 – September 16, 2014) was an American behavioral neuroscientist. He was the William M. Keck Professor of Psychology and Biological Sciences at the University of Southern California, with a parallel appointment as professor of neurology. Thompson was known for his groundbreaking work on learning and memory and his work on the cerebellum was seminal in showing its implication in classical conditioning. During his career, he served as editor-in-chief of the scientific journals Physiological Psychology, Journal of Comparative and Physiological Psychology, and Behavioral Neuroscience.

Life and education 
Thompson was born in Portland, Oregon and obtained a bachelor's degree in psychology from Reed College and a master's and PhD in psychology from the University of Wisconsin–Madison. Thompson died in Los Angeles, California.

Influence 
Thompson published 450 research papers, which, according to the Web of Science, have been cited nearly over 23,000 times, giving him an h-index of 80. In 1967, Thompson also authored Foundations of Physiological Psychology (New York, Harper & Row), which "revolutionized the way that behavioral neuroscience was presented and learned".

References 

1930 births
2014 deaths
Members of the United States National Academy of Sciences
University of Southern California faculty
Academic journal editors
Reed College alumni
University of Wisconsin–Madison alumni
American neuroscientists
Memory researchers
20th-century American psychologists
Scientists from Portland, Oregon